Sarcotheca glomerula is a species of plant in the family Oxalidaceae. It is endemic to Peninsular Malaysia.

References

glomerula
Endemic flora of Peninsular Malaysia
Least concern plants
Taxonomy articles created by Polbot